Aghavea is a civil parish and townland (of 131 acres) in County Fermanagh, Northern Ireland. It is situated in the historic barony of Magherastephana.

Towns and villages
The civil parish contains the village of Brookeborough.

Townlands
The civil parish contains the following townlands:

Aghalun
Aghavea
Aghavea Glebe
Aghnacloy North
Aghnacloy South
Aghnagrane
Ardmoney
Ardmore
Ardunshin
Arlish
Ballyhill
Ballyreagh
Boyhill
Breandrum
Broughderg
Bunlougher
Bunnisnagapple
Carntrone
Carrickyheenan
Cavanagarvan
Cavans
Cleffany
Coolcoghill
Coolnagrane
Coolrakelly
Cornafannoge
Cornamucklagh
Creagh
Curraghanall
Currin
Deer Park
Derryheely
Derryvree
Dressoge
Drumadagarve
Drumarraght
Drumbad
Drumbrughas
Drumee
Drumgorran
Drumgowna
Drumhoy
Drumlone
Drumoris
Dungoghy
Edenagilhorn
Ervey
Eshacorran
Eshnadarragh
Eshnanumera
Foydragh
Giltagh
Gola
Gorteen
Greagh
Greenhill
Hollymount
Killartry
Killybreagy
Killycramph
Killykeeran
Knockmacmanus
Largy
Lisboy
Liscosker
Lisdrum
Lismalore
Lisnabane
Lisolvan
Littlemount
Lurgan
Monmurry
Mulnadoran
Nutfield
Owenbreedin
Rathkeelan
Skeagh
Skeoge
Stranafeley
Tattenamona
Tattinbarr
Tattinfree
Tattykeeran
Tonavally
Toolinn
Trasna
Trustan
Tullynagowan
Tullyreagh

See also 
 List of civil parishes of County Fermanagh

References